Eagle Point may refer to:

Places
United States
 Eagle Point, Alabama
 Eagle Point, New Jersey
 Eagle Point, Oregon
 Eagle Point, Berks County, Pennsylvania
 Eagle Point, Lehigh County, Pennsylvania
 Eagle Point, Wisconsin, a town
 Eagle Point (community), Wisconsin, an unincorporated community

Australia
Eagle Point, Victoria , a town

Fictional
 American Gods

See also
United States
 Eagle Point Park, Dubuque, Iowa
 Eagle Point Park, Pasco County Florida
 Eagle Point (Olympic Mountains)